Keith Robinson (born January 17, 1976) is an American actor and R&B singer.

Early life
Robinson was born in Louisville, Kentucky, attended public schools in Greenville, SC, and later moved to the Evans suburb of Augusta, Georgia. While attending the University of Georgia, Robinson signed a recording contract with Motown Records, although the label never issued any of his material.

Career
Moving to Los Angeles and turning to acting, Robinson gained a starring role in the TV series Power Rangers Lightspeed Rescue as Joel Rawlings, the Green Lightspeed Ranger. After the end of the series, he appeared in such films as Fat Albert, and Mimic: Sentinel. Robinson also appeared in such television series as American Dreams, Monk, and Over There.

Robinson and Obba Babatundé (who portrayed C.C. White in the original Broadway production of Dreamgirls) both had recurring roles on the UPN series Half & Half. Robinson recently played the role of Chester Fields, on Fox's Canterbury's Law. Most recently, Robinson appeared in the supporting role of C.C. White in the film adaptation of the Broadway musical Dreamgirls. The film includes a Robinson-led version of the Dreamgirls song "Family". Robinson joined his fellow Dreamgirls cast members to perform "Patience", one of the new songs written for the film, at the 79th Academy Awards ceremony. He appeared in the film This Christmas. Robinson also performed in Comanche Moon:Road to Lonesome Dove.

Filmography

Film

Television

Music videos
"Love Somebody"(2016)
Got Your Back (2010)

External links
 Keith Robinson's official website
 
 Keith Robinson's Official MySpace profile
 

21st-century American male actors
Male actors from Augusta, Georgia
African-American male actors
American male film actors
American male television actors
American rhythm and blues musicians
1976 births
Living people
Male actors from Louisville, Kentucky
Musicians from Louisville, Kentucky
Singers from Kentucky
University of Georgia alumni
21st-century African-American male singers